Billy Quan was a fictional television character who originated in the Seattle TV comedy series Almost Live! in the 1990s.  Quan was featured in a series of recurring skits called Mind Your Manners with Billy Quan, intended as parodies of the films of martial arts star and former Seattle resident Bruce Lee.

The general format of the skits, which averaged one to two minutes long, featured Quan being offended by the rude manners of another unnamed character, usually Almost Live! host John Keister. When Quan pointed out the offensive manners, Keister's character would challenge Quan in a highly exaggerated martial arts battle using such things as pool cues, golf clubs, bowling balls and garden tools. The skits would usually end when Quan would launch himself toward Keister in a preposterous two-legged martial arts kick. The camera would show Quan's two legs aiming toward Keister, who often ran away. Quan's legs would stay in the air and follow Keister, sometimes around corners or waiting outside of doors. In the end, Keister was always defeated. The announcer would close with "Remember, kids: be like Billy. Behave yourself!".

Quan was played by Almost Live! cameraman Darrell Suto. The voice and mouth movements of the characters were greatly out of sync, a reference to some of Lee's early martial arts films. The titles were parodies of Enter the Dragon, Game of Death, or Fists of Fury. Quan's voice-over was done by Almost Live! cast member Pat Cashman. Keister's voice was his own.

Later the character was seen on Fox TV's series Haywire and on the PBS series Bill Nye the Science Guy.

External links
 KING-TV Almost Live! website
 

American television sketch shows
Local television programming in the United States
Mass media in Seattle